Welcome To Wonderland may refer to:
 "Welcome to Wonderland", a song from the album Wonderland by Sea of Treachery
 Welcome to Wonderland (Wonder Girls documentary), a documentary about the Wonder Girls daily life
 Welcome to Wonderland (film), a feature documentary film about music and dance
 The "Welcome to Wonderland" series, books for children written by Chris Grabenstein